St Peter's Church was an Anglican parish church in the village of Saltfleetby, Lincolnshire, England.  Due to subsidence, the main part of the church was moved elsewhere in the village and the tower was left at this location. The tower is recorded in the National Heritage List for England as a designated Grade I listed building, and it is now under the care of the Friends of Friendless Churches.

The tower is known locally as The Stump.

History
The tower dates from the 15th century, with some re-building of the north side in the 20th century.  It was taken into the care of the charity the Friends of Friendless Churches in 1976.  The charity holds a 999-year lease with effect from 1 May 1976.

Architecture
The older part of the tower is constructed in limestone ashlar, with greenstone rubble used in the 20th-century re-building; it also contains some red brick.  It is built in three stages and has four-stage angle buttresses.  In the bottom stage is a pointed doorway, above which is a string course.  In the middle stage is a four-light window with rich tracery, over which is another string course. The top stage contains two-light bell openings on three sides.  On the north side is a plaque to the memory of Mark Stubbs, who contributed financially to the maintenance of the tower.  On the southeast corner is a stair turret, with a doorway on its north side.

See also
All Saints Church, Saltfleetby

References

Further reading

15th-century church buildings in England
Grade I listed churches in Lincolnshire
Church of England church buildings in Lincolnshire
Churches preserved by the Friends of Friendless Churches
English Gothic architecture in Lincolnshire